Hrvoje Relota (born 19 January 1996) is a Croatian football defender, currently playing for NK Uskok.

Coming from Kaštela, Relota went through the ranks of Val Kaštel Stari, considered to be one of the best young sportsmen of his town in 2012. In 2013, he debuted and played several games for his club's senor team. At the beginning of 2014, he joined the RNK Split academy, winning the U19 2014/15 national championship with them. He was never a part of a youth international team (as of May 2016), but was a member of an unofficial U-19 selection of players from Dalmatia that played a friendly with HNK Hajduk Split's U19 team in February 2015.

In the summer of 2015, however, he joined HNK Hajduk Split, becoming a part of the B team. He was called up to the senior team that was missing 14 players for the last game of the 2015/16 season, along with Ardian Ismajli and Josip Maganjić. He made his first team debut on May 14, 2016 in a 3-2 away win against NK Zagreb, playing the entire game and clearing a goal-bound shot by Alen Jurilj from the line in the 72nd minute.

References

External links

1996 births
Living people
Footballers from Split, Croatia
Association football fullbacks
Croatian footballers
HNK Hajduk Split players
HNK Hajduk Split II players
NK Dugopolje players
NK Solin players
NK Uskok players
Croatian Football League players
First Football League (Croatia) players